Chude Jideonwo (born 16 March 1985) is a Nigerian TV host, filmmaker and media entrepreneur. He is also a lawyer.

He is the founder of Joy, Inc., an American benefit corporation with a Nigerian subsidiary, which aims to make people happier. He has worked for several years in media, advertising and public relations. He is also involved in news, social media and youth lifestyles. He is the executive producer and host of #WithChude, a special series of targeted multimedia (video, audio, text, event)  conversations and investigations that leverage his voice, network, passion and interviews to underline issues, raise consciousness, and spark movements; especially in Africa and for Africans. Focused on narratives that enable and strengthen the mind (mental health), heart (emotional health), and spirit (spiritual health), the themes of #WithChude center on empathy, compassion, mindfulness, wellness, happiness, love, joy, and food for the soul.

He is also director of #ChudeExplains, a series of films that takes stories off the headlines and goes in-depth to find and explain the hidden truths that explain who we are and where we go next – with a focus on social justice and culture. His very first film, Awaiting Trial, was Official Selection and Nominee for the Africa International Film Festival.

Before Joy Inc., he led the African media group, Red Africa for 13 years, working on national elections and social movements in Nigeria, Ghana, Kenya and Liberia. He is a co-founder of The Future Project, which is focused on inspiring leadership, building entrepreneurs, and using the media (traditional and new) as a tool for social change. Through Red Africa, his team has led communication campaigns for two Nigerian presidents and a Ghanaian President.

Early life 
Jideonwo was born in Lagos to Ifeanyi S. Jideonwo and Ngozi A. Jideonwo. He attended K. Kotun Memorial Primary School, Adebola Baptist High School and the Mayflower School, Ikenne.

He studied Law at the University of Lagos, emerging as the Best Student in Land Law. Thereafter, he was called to the Nigerian Bar in November 2007.

Jideonwo concluded a Master's programme in media and communication at the Pan-African University, Lagos.

Career

TV 
Jideonwo began his career as a TV presenter on the NTA, then worked as a researcher with Celebrating Jesus (MBI) and Inside Out with Agatha, a TV show with Agatha Amata syndicated across the country where he met Adebola Williams with whom he later co-founded Red Africa. He was also with New Dawn, which showed on the NTA Network, for three years, rising to become Associate Producer as well as heading the Special Projects division. His credits as writer, assistant director, and host include The Academy, Patito's Gang, Video 10, Big Brother Nigeria in 2006 and Moments with Mo (MNet) a year after.

He was the host of Rubbin' Minds talk show on Channels Television and frequently moonlights as an events compere.

While working at New Dawn with Funmi Iyanda, Jideonwo met his future partners, who both had a show on NTA network called Youth Talk. In the course of their work in 2004, they met and decided to form a company focused on using the media as a tool to inspire and drive young people to action. RedSTRAT, the product of this alliance, was registered formally the 2005.

He is the host of #WithChude, a network of media products across TV, Radio, Podcast, Newsletter and Blog telling stories that enable and strengthen the mind, the heart, and the spirit. The weekly interviews are widely syndicated across Channels TV, Rave TV and WaZoBia Max, all accessible on terrestrial TV, GOTV, StarTimes and DSTV platforms, and social media platforms reaching a minimum of 8 million people weekly. Guests on the show includes political, government and cultural leaders, and those that won't consider themselves famous. It has also become the safe space for guest to talk about things publicly for the first time; Joke Silva talked about how her husband, Olu Jacobs was dealing with dementia with Lewy body for the first time on #WithChude. Jim Iyke talked about his failed marriages and having children for the first time.  

The show has consistently shone the spotlight on critical issues, and sparked nationwide conversations about topics discussed on the show. In March 2022, Kemi Afolabi opened up about her experience dealing with Lupus on #WithChude. That month, lupus, Kemi Afolabi were among the top Google Nigeria searches. It also led to a wide-spread attention on lupus by several media platforms, including the BBC.

Print 
Jideonwo has written and edited more than 15 publications within and outside the country. He joined the defunct NEXT Newspapers, as copy editor in July 2009, the youngest in that position, from where he became a member of the paper's editorial board.

He ran a column, Sons and Daughters, for three years in the Sunday edition of The Guardian, profiling children of the rich and famous.

Are We The Turning Point Generation (2014) 
In May 2014, his collection of essays, rhetorically titled Are We The Turning Point Generation? was launched in Lagos, Nigeria. Published by Farafina, it has toured Lagos, Abuja, Johannesburg, London, Paris and New York.

How to Win Elections in Africa: Parallels with Donald Trump (2017) 
In November 2017, Jideonwo released How to Win Elections in Africa - a socio-political essay which explores all the factors that contribute to the success or otherwise of election campaigns drawing parallels from the 2016 elections which brought Donald Trump into power, and the Brexit vote in the United Kingdom. Published by Farafina.

Entrepreneurship 
At present, Jideonwo is the founder of Joy, Inc. and sits on the board of RED, the full-service media-content, communication and development company he co-founded, that has worked for several national and international brands. He met Adebola Williams, co-founder of Red on the set of Inside Out with Agatha, with Agatha Amata, where he formally worked as a production assistant.

He is also director of #ChudeExplains, a series of films that takes stories off the headlines and goes in-depth to find and explain the hidden truths that explain who we are and where we go next – with a focus on social justice and culture. His very first film, Awaiting Trial, was Official Selection and Nominee for the Africa International Film Festival.

Joy, Inc. 
Joy Inc, a teaching and media company was registered as a benefit corporation, with its profits to be invested in selected charities – mainstreaming the research and evidence on human flourishing to transform the culture and build a new generation of Africans focused on the greatest happiness for the greatest many. Products of the revolutionary startup include #WithChude, The Joy Masterclass, The Joy Congress, Joy: The Podcast, The Joy Clubs, The Joy Store and The Daily Vulnerable. In March 2022, Joy, Inc. unveiled Therapy.WithChude.com, a learning and therapeutic platform that provides practical steps to issues faced by several young people.  Some of the issues on the learning platform includes how to deal with post-natal depression, how to deal with depression and anxiety and how to deal with toxic Christianity.

Red (Red Africa) 
RED's brands include The Future Awards Africa, Red Media Africa, StateCraft, Inc. and YNaija, and has consulted for global brands including Microsoft, Google, the British Council and the United States Government. It has successfully managed the campaign communication for two consecutive Nigerian Presidents. Through Statecraft Inc, Red's governance communication company, Jideonwo led on the communication front for the Muhammadu Buhari campaign in 2015.

In 2016, StateCraft Inc. also led the communication component of the campaign that saw Nana Akufo-Addo win the presidential elections in Ghana after three previous unsuccessful attempts.

Achievements and awards 
In 2011, young Jideonwo interviewed a sitting Nigerian president; securing a sit-down with Goodluck Jonathan.

Also known as a book reviewer, his novel, His Father's Knickers, written when he was 13, was launched in 2001 in conjunction with the National Orientation Agency and the French Cultural Centre.

In May 2012, Jideonwo was appointed the youngest member of the awards committee for the Ford Foundation Jubilee Transparency Award and in July was appointed into the British Council's Steering Group for its Creative Industries Expo.

Nigeria's daily, The Punch listed Jideonwo alongside thirteen others, as one of the young people to watch in 2012.

Also, in 2012, BusinessDay included him and his business partner, Williams, in a 40 under 40 list,.

In February 2013, both Jideonwo and Williams were named in Forbes 30 Under 30: Africa's Best Young Entrepreneurs.

Jideonwo was selected as a 2017 Greenberg Fellow at Yale University, New Haven, Connecticut.

In March 2018, Jideonwo was selected alongside several other 17 other young leaders from all over Africa For the 2018 Tutu Leadership Programme.

In 2020, he endowed The Nigeria Prize for Difference and Diversity with a million naira. The prize will find and support young people across Nigeria who are creating safe spaces for and giving voice to people who are different in seven key areas: gender, sexuality, faith and spirituality, mental and emotional health, art, special needs, and human rights.

Personal life 
He lives and works in Lagos, Nigeria.

References 

1985 births
Living people
Nigerian television journalists
Writers from Lagos
University of Lagos alumni
Nigerian newspaper journalists
Pan-Atlantic University alumni
Mayflower School alumni